The 2018 Le Castellet GP3 Series round was a motor racing event held on 23 and 24 June 2018 at the Circuit Paul Ricard, Le Castellet, France. It was the opening round of the 2018 GP3 Series, and ran in support of the 2018 French Grand Prix.

Classification

Feature Race

Sprint Race

Standings after the event 

Drivers' Championship standings

Teams' Championship standings

 Note: Only the top five positions are included for both sets of standings.

See also 
 2018 French Grand Prix
 2018 Le Castellet Formula 2 round

References

External links 
Official website

|- style="text-align:center"
|width="35%"|Previous race:
|width="30%"|GP3 Series2018 season
|width="40%"|Next race:

Le Castellet
GP3
GP3 Le Castellet